The Amalfian Laws are a code of maritime laws compiled in the 12th century in Amalfi, a town in Italy.

They took the form of the Tabula Amalfitana (Amalfi's Board), and were for centuries the international mercantile code accepted and taken as a model.

Admiralty law
Amalfi Coast
Medieval legal codes
Legal history of Italy
Duchy of Amalfi